Gloria Andrea Curra  (born June 15, 1971 in Banfield, Buenos Aires, Argentina) better known as Gloria Carrá is an Argentine actress, singer and composer. She changed her real last name on the advice of the actor Darío Vittori.

Music 
She is the founder, lead singer, guitarist and composer of the band Coronados de Gloria. In 2018, she and several other female artists recorded a version of the song "Bella Ciao" in support of the right to legal abortion in Argentina.

Filmography

Television

Theater

Movies

Television Programs

Awards and nominations

References

External links 
 

Argentine television actresses
1971 births
People from Banfield, Buenos Aires
Living people